Dennis Novak was the defending champion but chose not to defend his title.

Maximilian Marterer won the title after defeating Tomáš Macháč 6–7(3–7), 6–2, 7–5 in the final.

Seeds

Draw

Finals

Top half

Bottom half

References

External links
Main draw
Qualifying draw

Slovak Open - Singles
2020 Singles